Khonak (also Romanized as Khonok; also known as Gunak and Jonak) is a village in Sefidar Rural District, Khafr District, Jahrom County, Fars Province, Iran. At the 2006 census, its population was 285, in 64 families.

References 

Populated places in  Jahrom County